Florence Cathedral, formally the  (in English Cathedral of Saint Mary of the Flower), is the cathedral of Florence, Italy. It was begun in 1296 in the Gothic style to a design of Arnolfo di Cambio and was structurally completed by 1436, with the dome engineered by Filippo Brunelleschi. The exterior of the basilica is faced with polychrome marble panels in various shades of green and pink, bordered by white, and has an elaborate 19th-century Gothic Revival façade by Emilio De Fabris.

The cathedral complex, in Piazza del Duomo, includes the Baptistery and Giotto's Campanile. These three buildings are part of the UNESCO World Heritage Site covering the historic centre of Florence and are a major tourist attraction of Tuscany. The basilica is one of Italy's largest churches, and until the development of new structural materials in the modern era, the dome was the largest in the world. It remains the largest brick dome ever constructed.

The cathedral is the mother church of the Archdiocese of Florence, whose archbishop is Giuseppe Betori.

History

Santa Maria del Fiore was built on the site of Florence's second cathedral dedicated to Saint Reparata; the first was the Basilica di San Lorenzo di Firenze, the first building of which was consecrated as a church in 393 by St. Ambrose of Milan. The ancient structure, founded in the early 5th century and having undergone many repairs, was crumbling with age, according to the 14th-century Nuova Cronica of Giovanni Villani, and was no longer large enough to serve the growing population of the city. Other major Tuscan cities had undertaken ambitious reconstructions of their cathedrals during the Late Medieval period, such as Pisa and particularly Siena where the enormous proposed extensions were never completed.

City council approved the design of Arnolfo di Cambio for the new church in 1294. Di Cambio was also architect of the church of Santa Croce and the Palazzo Vecchio. He designed three wide naves ending under the octagonal dome, with the middle nave covering the area of Santa Reparata. The first stone was laid on 9 September 1296, by Cardinal Valeriana, the first papal legate ever sent to Florence. The building of this vast project was to last 140 years; Arnolfo's plan for the eastern end, although maintained in concept, was greatly expanded in size.

After Arnolfo died in 1302, work on the cathedral slowed for almost 50 years. When the relics of Saint Zenobius were discovered in 1330 in Santa Reparata, the project gained a new impetus. In 1331, the Arte della Lana, the guild of wool merchants, took over patronage for the construction of the cathedral and in 1334 appointed Giotto to oversee the work. Assisted by Andrea Pisano, Giotto continued di Cambio's design. His major accomplishment was the building of the campanile. When Giotto died on 8 January 1337, Andrea Pisano continued the building until work was halted due to the Black Death in 1348.

In 1349, work resumed on the cathedral under a series of architects, starting with Francesco Talenti, who finished the campanile and enlarged the overall project to include the apse and the side chapels. In 1359, Talenti was succeeded by Giovanni di Lapo Ghini (1360–1369) who divided the centre nave in four square bays. Other architects were Alberto Arnoldi, Giovanni d'Ambrogio, Neri di Fioravanti and Andrea Orcagna. By 1375, the old church Santa Reparata was pulled down. The nave was finished by 1380, and only the dome remained incomplete until 1418.

On 19 August 1418, the Arte della Lana announced an architectural design competition for erecting Neri's dome. The two main competitors were two master goldsmiths, Lorenzo Ghiberti and Filippo Brunelleschi, the latter of whom was supported by Cosimo de Medici. Ghiberti had been the winner of a competition for a pair of bronze doors for the Baptistery in 1401 and lifelong competition between the two remained sharp. Brunelleschi won and received the commission.

Ghiberti, appointed coadjutor, drew a salary equal to Brunelleschi's and, though neither was awarded the announced prize of 200 florins, was promised equal credit, although he spent most of his time on other projects. When Brunelleschi became ill, or feigned illness, the project was briefly in the hands of Ghiberti. But Ghiberti soon had to admit that the whole project was beyond him. In 1423, Brunelleschi was back in charge and took over sole responsibility.

Work on the dome began in 1420 and finished in 1436. The cathedral was consecrated by Pope Eugene IV on 25 March 1436, (the first day of the year according to the Florentine calendar). It was the first 'octagonal' dome in history to be built without a temporary wooden supporting frame. It was one of the most impressive projects of the Renaissance. During the consecration in 1436, Guillaume Dufay's motet Nuper rosarum flores was performed.

The decoration of the exterior of the cathedral, begun in the 14th century, was not completed until 1887, when the polychrome marble façade was completed with the design of Emilio De Fabris. The floor of the church was relaid in marble tiles in the 16th century.

The exterior walls are faced in alternate vertical and horizontal bands of polychrome marble from Carrara (white), Prato (green), Siena (red), Lavenza and a few other places. These marble bands had to repeat the already existing bands on the walls of the earlier adjacent baptistery the Battistero di San Giovanni and Giotto's Bell Tower. There are two side doors: the Doors of the Canonici (south side) and the Door of the Mandorla (north side) with sculptures by Nanni di Banco, Donatello, and Jacopo della Quercia. The six side windows, notable for their delicate tracery and ornaments, are separated by pilasters. Only the four windows closest to the transept admit light; the other two are merely ornamental. The clerestory windows are round, a common feature in Italian Gothic.

Exterior

Plan and structure

The cathedral of Florence is built as a basilica, having a wide central nave of four square bays, with an aisle on either side. The chancel and transepts are of identical polygonal plan, separated by two smaller polygonal chapels. The whole plan forms a Latin cross. The nave and aisles are separated by wide pointed Gothic arches resting on composite piers.

The dimensions of the building are enormous: building area , length , width , width at the crossing . It has the fifth tallest dome in the world.

Planned sculpture for the exterior
The Overseers of the Office of Works of Florence Cathedral the Arte della Lana, had plans to commission a series of twelve large Old Testament sculptures for the buttresses of the cathedral. Donatello, then in his early twenties, was commissioned to carve a statue of David in 1408, to top one of the buttresses of Florence Cathedral, though it was never placed there. Nanni di Banco was commissioned to carve a marble statue of Isaiah, at the same scale, in the same year. One of the statues was lifted into place in 1409, but was found to be too small to be easily visible from the ground and was taken down; both statues then languished in the workshop of the opera for several years. In 1410 Donatello made the first of the statues, a figure of Joshua in terracotta. In 1409-1411 Donatello made a statue of Saint John the Evangelist which until 1588 was in a niche of the old cathedral façade. Between 1415 and 1426, Donatello created five statues for the campanile of Santa Maria del Fiore in Florence, also known as the Duomo. These works are the Beardless Prophet; Bearded Prophet (both from 1415); the Sacrifice of Isaac (1421); Habbakuk (1423–25); and Jeremiah (1423–26); which follow the classical models for orators and are characterized by strong portrait details.  A figure of Hercules, also in terracotta, was commissioned from the Florentine sculptor Agostino di Duccio in 1463 and was made perhaps under Donatello's direction. A statue of David by Michelangelo was completed 1501-1504 although it could not be placed on the buttress because of its six-ton weight. In 2010 a fiberglass replica of "David" was placed for one day on the Florence cathedral.

Dome
After a hundred years of construction and by the beginning of the 15th century, the structure was still missing its dome. The basic features of the dome had been designed by Arnolfo di Cambio in 1296. It called for an octagonal dome higher and wider than any that had ever been built, with no external buttresses to keep it from spreading and falling under its own weight.

The commitment to reject traditional Gothic buttresses had been made when Neri di Fioravanti's model was chosen over a competing one by Giovanni di Lapo Ghini. That architectural choice, in 1367, was one of the first events of the Italian Renaissance, marking a break with the Medieval Gothic style and a return to the classic Mediterranean dome. Italian architects regarded Gothic flying buttresses as ugly makeshifts. Furthermore, the use of buttresses was forbidden in Florence, as the style was favored by central Italy's traditional enemies to the north. Neri's model depicted a massive inner dome, open at the top to admit light, like Rome's Pantheon, partly supported by the inner dome, but enclosed in a thinner outer shell, to keep out the weather. It was to stand on an unbuttressed octagonal drum. Neri's dome would need an internal defense against spreading (hoop stress), but none had yet been designed.

The building of such a masonry dome posed many technical problems. Brunelleschi looked to the great dome of the Pantheon in Rome for solutions. The dome of the Pantheon is a single shell of concrete, the formula for which had long since been forgotten. The Pantheon had employed structural centring to support the concrete dome while it cured. This could not be the solution in the case of a dome this size and would put the church out of use. Brunelleschi chose to follow such design and employed a double shell, made of sandstone and marble. Brunelleschi would have to build the dome out of brick, due to its light weight compared to stone and being easier to form, and with nothing under it during construction. To illustrate his proposed structural plan, he constructed a wooden and brick model with the help of Donatello and Nanni di Banco, a model which is still displayed in the Museo dell'Opera del Duomo. The model served as a guide for the craftsmen, but was intentionally incomplete, so as to ensure Brunelleschi's control over the construction.

Brunelleschi's solutions were ingenious. The spreading problem was solved by a set of four internal horizontal stone and iron chains, serving as barrel hoops, embedded within the inner dome: one at the top, one at the bottom, with the remaining two evenly spaced between them. A fifth chain, made of wood, was placed between the first and second of the stone chains. Since the dome was octagonal rather than round, a simple chain, squeezing the dome like a barrel hoop, would have put all its pressure on the eight corners of the dome. The chains needed to be rigid octagons, stiff enough to hold their shape, so as not to deform the dome as they held it together.

The rails were connected end-to-end with lead-glazed iron splices. The cross ties and rails were notched together and then covered with the bricks and mortar of the inner dome. The cross ties of the bottom chain can be seen protruding from the drum at the base of the dome. The others are hidden. Each stone chain was supposed to be reinforced with a standard iron chain made of interlocking links, but a magnetic survey conducted in the 1970s failed to detect any evidence of iron chains, which if they exist are deeply embedded in the thick masonry walls. Brunelleschi also included vertical "ribs" set on the corners of the octagon, curving towards the center point. The ribs had slits to take beams that supported platforms, thus allowing the work to progress upward without the need for scaffolding.

A circular masonry dome can be built without supports, called centering, because each course of bricks is a horizontal arch that resists compression. In Florence, the octagonal inner dome was thick enough for an imaginary circle to be embedded in it at each level, a feature that would hold the dome up eventually, but could not hold the bricks in place while the mortar was still wet. Brunelleschi used a herringbone brick pattern to transfer the weight of the freshly laid bricks to the nearest vertical ribs of the non-circular dome.

To create such circles, Brunelleschi thickened the outer dome at the inside of its corners at nine different elevations, creating nine masonry rings, which can be observed today from the space between the two domes. To counteract hoop stress, the outer dome relies entirely on its attachment to the inner dome and has no embedded chains.

A modern understanding of physical laws and the mathematical tools for calculating stresses were centuries in the future. Brunelleschi, like all cathedral builders, had to rely on intuition and whatever he could learn from the large scale models he built. To lift 37,000 tons of material, including over 4 million bricks, he invented hoisting machines and lewissons for hoisting large stones. These specially designed machines and his structural innovations were Brunelleschi's chief contribution to architecture. Although he was executing an aesthetic plan made half a century earlier, it is his name, rather than Neri's, that is commonly associated with the dome.

Brunelleschi's ability to crown the dome with a lantern was questioned and he had to undergo another competition, even though there had been evidence that Brunelleschi had been working on a design for a lantern for the upper part of the dome. The evidence is shown in the curvature, which was made steeper than the original model. He was declared the winner over his competitors Lorenzo Ghiberti and Antonio Ciaccheri. His design (now on display in the Museum Opera del Duomo) was for an octagonal lantern with eight radiating buttresses and eight high arched windows. Construction of the lantern was begun a few months before his death in 1446. Then, for 15 years, little progress was possible, due to alterations by several architects. The lantern was finally completed by Brunelleschi's friend Michelozzo in 1461. The conical roof was crowned with a gilt copper ball and cross, containing holy relics, by Verrocchio in 1469. This copper ball was struck by lightning on 17 July 1600 and fell down. It was replaced by an even larger one two years later.

The commission for this gilt copper ball [atop the lantern] went to the sculptor Andrea del Verrocchio, in whose workshop there was at this time a young apprentice named Leonardo da Vinci. Fascinated by Filippo's [Brunelleschi's] machines, which Verrocchio used to hoist the ball, Leonardo made a series of sketches of them and, as a result, is often given credit for their invention.

Leonardo might have also participated in the design of the bronze ball, as stated in the G manuscript of Paris "Remember the way we soldered the ball of Santa Maria del Fiore".

The decorations of the drum gallery by Baccio d'Agnolo were never finished after being disapproved by no one less than Michelangelo.

A huge statue of Brunelleschi now sits outside the Palazzo dei Canonici in the Piazza del Duomo, looking thoughtfully up towards his greatest achievement, the dome that would forever dominate the panorama of Florence. It is still the largest masonry dome in the world.

The building of the cathedral had started in 1296 with the design of Arnolfo di Cambio and was completed in 1469 with the placing of Verrochio's copper ball atop the lantern. But the façade was still unfinished and would remain so until the 19th century.

Facade

The original façade, designed by Arnolfo di Cambio and usually attributed to Giotto, was actually begun twenty years after Giotto's death. A mid-15th-century pen-and-ink drawing of this so-called Giotto's façade is visible in the Codex Rustici, and in the drawing of Bernardino Poccetti in 1587, both on display in the Museum of the Opera del Duomo. This façade was the collective work of several artists, among them Andrea Orcagna and Taddeo Gaddi. This original façade was completed in only its lower portion and then left unfinished. It was dismantled in 1587–1588 by the Medici court architect Bernardo Buontalenti, ordered by Grand Duke Francesco I de' Medici, as it appeared totally outmoded in Renaissance times. Some of the original sculptures are on display in the Museum Opera del Duomo, behind the cathedral. Others are now in the Berlin Museum and in the Louvre.

The competition for a new façade turned into a huge corruption scandal. The wooden model for the façade of Buontalenti is on display in the Museum Opera del Duomo. A few new designs had been proposed in later years, but the models (of Giovanni Antonio Dosio, Giovanni de' Medici with Alessandro Pieroni and Giambologna) were not accepted. The façade was then left bare until the 19th century.

In 1864, a competition held to design a new façade was won by Emilio De Fabris (1808–1883) in 1871. Work began in 1876 and was completed in 1887. This neo-gothic façade in white, green and red marble forms a harmonious entity with the cathedral, Giotto's bell tower and the Baptistery, but some think it is excessively decorated.

The whole façade is dedicated to the Mother of Christ.

Main Portal
The three huge bronze doors date from 1899 to 1903. They are adorned with scenes from the life of the Madonna. The mosaics in the lunettes above the doors were designed by Niccolò Barabino. They represent (from left to right): Charity among the founders of Florentine philanthropic institutions; Christ enthroned with Mary and John the Baptist; and Florentine artisans, merchants and humanists. The pediment above the central portal contains a half-relief by Tito Sarrocchi of Mary enthroned holding a flowered scepter. Giuseppe Cassioli sculpted the right-hand door.

On top of the façade is a series of niches with the twelve Apostles with, in the middle, the Madonna with Child. Between the rose window and the tympanum, there is a gallery with busts of great Florentine artists.

Interior

The Gothic interior is vast and gives an empty impression. The relative bareness of the church corresponds with the austerity of religious life, as preached by Girolamo Savonarola.

Many decorations in the church have been lost in the course of time, or have been transferred to the Museum Opera del Duomo, such as the magnificent cantorial pulpits (the singing galleries for the choristers) of Luca della Robbia and Donatello.

As this cathedral was built with funds from the public, some important works of art in this church honour illustrious men and military leaders of Florence:

Lorenzo Ghiberti had a large artistic impact on the cathedral. Ghiberti worked with Filippo Brunelleschi on the cathedral for eighteen years and had a large number of projects on almost the whole east end. Some of his works were the stained glass designs, the bronze shrine of Saint Zenobius and marble revetments on the outside of the cathedral.

Dante Before the City of Florence by Domenico di Michelino (1465). This painting is especially interesting because it shows us, apart from scenes of the Divine Comedy, a view on Florence in 1465, a Florence such as Dante himself could not have seen in his time.
Funerary Monument to Sir John Hawkwood by Paolo Uccello (1436). This almost monochrome fresco, transferred to canvas in the 19th century, is painted in terra verde, a color closest to the patina of bronze.
Equestrian statue of Niccolò da Tolentino by Andrea del Castagno (1456). This fresco, transferred on canvas in the 19th century, in the same style as the previous one, is painted in a color resembling marble. However, it is more richly decorated and gives more the impression of movement. Both frescoes portray the condottieri as heroic figures riding triumphantly. Both painters had problems when applying in painting the new rules of perspective to foreshortening: they used two unifying points, one for the horse and one for the pedestal, instead a single unifying point.
Busts of Giotto (by Benedetto da Maiano), Brunelleschi (by Buggiano – 1447), Marsilio Ficino, and Antonio Squarcialupi (a most famous organist). These busts all date from the 15th and the 16th centuries.

Above the main door is the colossal clock face with fresco portraits of four Prophets or Evangelists by Paolo Uccello (1443). This one-handed liturgical clock shows the 24 hours of the hora italica (Italian time), a period of time ending with sunset at 24 hours. This timetable was used until the 18th century. This is one of the few clocks from that time that still exist and are in working order.

The church is particularly notable for its 44 stained glass windows, the largest undertaking of this kind in Italy in the 14th and 15th century. The windows in the aisles and in the transept depict saints from the Old and the New Testament, while the circular windows in the drum of the dome or above the entrance depict Christ and Mary. They are the work of the greatest Florentine artists of their times, such as Donatello, Lorenzo Ghiberti, Paolo Uccello and Andrea del Castagno.

Christ crowning Mary as Queen, the stained-glass circular window above the clock, with a rich range of coloring, was designed by Gaddo Gaddi in the early 14th century.

Donatello designed the stained-glass window (Coronation of the Virgin) in the drum of the dome (the only one that can be seen from the nave).

The beautiful funeral monument of Antonio d'Orso (1323), bishop of Florence, was made by Tino da Camaino, the most important funeral sculptor of his time.

The monumental crucifix, behind the Bishop's Chair at the high altar, is by Benedetto da Maiano (1495–1497). The choir enclosure is the work of the famous Bartolommeo Bandinelli. The ten-paneled bronze doors of the sacristy were made by Luca della Robbia, who has also two glazed terracotta works inside the sacristy: Angel with Candlestick and Resurrection of Christ.

In the back of the middle of the three apses is the altar of Saint Zanobius, first bishop of Florence. Its silver shrine, a masterpiece of Ghiberti, contains the urn with his relics. The central compartment shows us one of his miracles, the reviving of a dead child. Above this shrine is the painting Last Supper by the lesser-known Giovanni Balducci. There was also a glass-paste mosaic panel The Bust of Saint Zanobius by the 16th-century miniaturist Monte di Giovanni, but it is now on display in the Museum Opera del Duomo.

Many decorations date from the 16th-century patronage of the Grand Dukes, such as the pavement in colored marble, attributed to Baccio d'Agnolo and Francesco da Sangallo (1520–26). Some pieces of marble from the façade were used, topside down, in the flooring (as was shown by the restoration of the floor after the 1966 flooding).

The ceiling of the dome is decorated with a representation of The Last Judgment. Originally left whitewashed following its completion it was the Grand Duke Cosimo I de' Medici who decided to have the ceiling of the dome painted. This enormous work, 3,600 metres² (38 750 ft²) of painted surface, was started in 1572 by Giorgio Vasari and would not be completed until 1579. The upper portion, near the lantern, representing The 24 Elders of Apocalypse was finished by Vasari before his death in 1574. Federico Zuccari with the assistance of Bartolomeo Carducci, Domenico Passignano and Stefano Pieri finished the other portions: (from top to bottom) Choirs of Angels; Christ, Mary and Saints; Virtues, Gifts of the Holy Spirit and Beatitudes; and at the bottom of the cupola: Capital Sins and Hell. These frescoes are considered Zuccari's greatest work. But the quality of the work is uneven because of the input of different artists and the different techniques. Vasari had used true fresco, while Zuccari had painted in secco. During the restoration work, which ended in 1995, the entire pictorial cycle of The Last Judgment was photographed with specially designed equipment and all the information collected in a catalogue. All the restoration information along with reconstructed images of the frescos were stored and managed in the Thesaurus Florentinus computer system.

Astronomical observations

This allows for observation for around 35 days either side of the summer solstice .

Due to settlement in the building and also movements due to the outside temperature changes, the meridian line had limited astronomical value and fell into disuse until it was restored in 1755 by Leonardo Ximenes.

The meridian line was covered over by the fabbricieri in 1894 and unveiled again in 1997. A yearly re-enacement of the observation takes place on 21 June each year at 12.00 UT.

Crypt

The cathedral underwent difficult excavations between 1965 and 1974. The archaeological history of this huge area was reconstructed through the work of Dr. Franklin Toker: remains of Roman houses, an early Christian pavement, ruins of the former cathedral of Santa Reparata and successive enlargements of this church. Close to the entrance, in the part of the crypt open to the public, is the tomb of Brunelleschi. While its location is prominent, the actual tomb is simple and humble. That the architect was permitted such a prestigious burial place is proof of the high esteem he was held in by the Florentines.

Other burials
Zenobius of Florence
Conrad II of Italy
Giovanni Benelli
Filippo Brunelleschi
Giotto di Bondone
Pope Nicholas II
Pope Stephen IX
John Hawkwood

Cracking of the dome
The unreinforced masonry that Brunelleschi used to construct the dome is weak in tension which leads to cracking when tensile stresses exceed the limited masonry tensile strength. The material is especially susceptible to damage from seismic loading due to its heterogeneity and many surfaces between different materials (stones to mortar connection).

Cracking of the dome was observed even before its construction was completed. It is possible that the first cracks were caused by a strong earthquake in 1453.

The first written evidence about the presence of cracks appears in a report by Gherardo Silvani report dated 18 September 1639 which refers to “peli” (“hairs”). They believed that the cracks were caused by the weight of the dome, and the resulting the horizontal thrusts on the pillars.
A commission, headed by Vincenzo Viviani carried out investigations in 1695 and came to the conclusion that the cracking was due to the dead weight of the buildings, it was proposed that the dome be strengthened by installing four large iron belts; three on the outside of the dome between the bugling area of the dome and the circular windows, while the fourth would be installed internally in the second walkway between the two shells. This was similar to what had been done on the dome of St. Peter's in Rome. After a long debate, a decision was made to leave the dome as it was.

The first most complete survey of the cracks was published in 1757 by the Jesuit Leonardo Ximenes (1716–1786). In his document he described 13 different crack typologies.
In 1934, Pier Luigi Nervi, who was head of a special commission established by the Opera del Duomo to study the cracking observed that the cracks opened and closed with the seasons. In the winter, the dome's stone and bricks would contract causing the cracks to widen while over the summer the materials would expand and the cracks would close up.
While modern buildings by design incorporate expansion joints, the cathedral's dome does not include any and so subsequently developed its own expansion joints in the form of these cracks which allowed the structure to “breathe”. To date they have not caused any catastrophic damage to the dome.

In 1955 the Opera del Duomo installed 22 mechanical deformometers, which were read four times a year to record the variations in the width of the major cracks in the inner dome. At the same time the dome's internal and external temperatures were also recorded. This remained in service until 2009.

In 1975 a commission was appointed by the Italian government to safeguard the dome. 
In 1978 a government culture agency decided to restore the frescoes. Brunelleschi left forty eight  holes in the base of the dome. They are open on the inside and covered by the outer skin of the dome. It has long been assumed that the holes simply served as mounts for the scaffold used when frescoes were painted on the inside of the dome. While the holes had been able to support the scaffolding used for the creation of the frescos on the interior of the dome they were not strong enough for the network of modern metal scaffolding necessary to provide access for the restoration work undertaken on the frescos between 1979 and 1995. To strengthen the scaffolding, the private company contracted to build scaffolding for the work was allowed in 1982 to fill the holes with concrete so that steel beams could be anchored in them.

In 1985 local architect Lando Bartoli noticed that additional cracks were forming around the sealed holes. It was theorized at the time that in summer the four major masses separated by the “A” cracks expanded into the fissures, but now, at the base of the dome, the masses come up against the unyielding concrete that now fills the 48 holes acts as a fulcrum which causes the energy that was once dissipated with the closing of the fissures and into the holes to be transferred into the upper areas of the dome.
However analysis by Andrea Chiarugi, Michele Fanelli and Giuseppetti (published in 1983) found that the principal source of the cracks was a dead-weight effect due to the geometry of the dome, its weight (estimated to be 25,000 tons) and the insufficient resistance of the ring beam, while thermal variations, has caused fatigue loading and thus expanding of the structure. 
This is a well-known collapse mechanism typical of domed structures: a lowering of the top of the structure under its own weight with significant horizontal thrusts on the bearing elements.

In 1985 a commission established by the Italian Ministry of Cultural and Monumental Heritage accepted this theory. The debate about the filling of the scaffolding holes was finally settled in 1987 when it was demonstrated that closing the 48 holes had had no impact on the expansion and contraction of the dome.
A survey completed in 1984 counted a total of 493 cracks of various sizes, sorted into categories identified by the letters “A” through “D”. These are as follows:
The dome has eight webs numbered counter clockwise from 1, which faces the main nave of the cathedral. These effectively divide the dome into quarters and never completely close in summer. There is a theory that the plaster used to patch the cracks over the years and crumbling building materials have jammed the fissures.
Type B. These sub-vertical minor cracks are located near the circular windows.
Type C. These are sub-vertical minor cracks that are present around the eight edges of the dome.
Type D. These are four sub-vertical minor cracks in the internal part of the odd webs. They do not pass through the width of the dome.
All have formed in a symmetrical pattern.

The development of the Type “A” cracks means that the dome now permanently behaves as four drifting half-arches linked below the upper oculus. The abutments of these half-arches are constituted by the pillars, the chapels and the nave of the church.
The differences in the cracking patterns between even and odd webs is believed to be due to variations in the stiffness of the supporting ring beam structure under the dome as it is supported by four heavy pillars which lien up with the even webs while the odd webs are located over four arches which connect the pillars.

In 1987 a second and more comprehensive digital system (which automatically collects data every six hours) was installed by ISMES (in cooperation with the “Soprintendenza”, the local branch of the Ministry of Culture, which is responsible for the conservation of all historical monuments in Florence) in 1987. It consists of 166 instruments, among which are 60 thermometers measuring the masonry and air temperature at various locations, 72 inductive type displacement transducers (deformometers) at various levels on the main cracks of the inner and outer domes; eight plumb-lines at the centre of each web, which measure the relative displacements between pillars and tambour; eight livellometers and two piezometers, one near the web 4 and the other below the nave which register the variation of the underground water level.
Another source quotes a movement of 5.5mm.

Using software that had been used to model the structures of large dam a computer model of the dome was developed in 1980 in a collaboration between Italian National Agency for Electric Power and Structural and Hydraulic Research Centre (CRIS) by a group of researcher leaded by Michele Fanelli and Gabriella Giuseppetti in cooperation with the Department of Civil Engineering of the University of Florence, under the supervision of Andrea Chiarugi. Because of limited computational resources and for reasons of symmetry only a quarter of the dome was modelled. The resulting finite elements analysis confirmed that the main cracks was essentially being created by self-weight of the dome. Since then series of numerical models of increasing complexity have been developed.
To assist in monitoring of the dome an extensive photogrammetric and topographical survey of the entire dome was commissioned in 1992 by the “Soprintendenza”. The results of this survey were then used to further develop the finite elements model of the dome.

See also

Italian Gothic architecture
Roman Catholic Marian churches
List of largest domes
List of tallest domes
List of tallest structures built before the 20th century
Santa Reparata, Florence
Inferno, 2013 Dan Brown novel
History of medieval Arabic and Western European domes
List of Gothic Cathedrals in Europe

Notes

References

 Library of Congress permalink
 (in line presentation)

Further reading
"The Great Cathedral Mystery", PBS Nova TV documentary, 12 February 2014

Hunt, Don, "Secrets of the Duomo" , Journal, Issue 2, 2014, International Union of Bricklayers and Allied Craftworkers

</ref>

Ricci, Massimo, Il genio di Brunelleschi e la costruzione della Cupola di Santa Maria del Fiore, Livorno : Casa Editrice Sillabe S.r.l., April 2014. (The genius of Filippo Brunelleschi and the construction of the dome of Santa Maria del Fiore). . The book is the result of forty years of research on the secret technique with which Brunelleschi built the Dome of Santa Maria del Fiore in Florence. Ricci makes the case for the dome being an inverted arch and uses a herringbone pattern (spina a pesce) for the dome's bricks.
Rice, John A. "Music in the Duomo of Florence during the Reign of Pietro Leopoldo I (1765–1790)"
Vereycken, Karel, "The Secrets of the Florentine Dome", Schiller Institute, 2013. (Translation from the French, "Les secrets du dôme de Florence", la revue Fusion, n° 96, Mai, Juin 2003)

External links

L'Opera del Duomo, Firenze
Brunelleschi's Dome – en

Museums in Florence – Cathedral and Giotto Belltower

NGM.NationalGeographic.com 2014– 02 Il Duomo 360 Panorama View Interactive 
NGM.NationalGeographic.com 2014-02 Il Duomo Cutaway Interactive 
ngm.nationalgeographic.com 2014-02 ll Duomo Piazza 360 degree panorama interactive 
ngm.nationalgeographic.com 2014-02 Il Duomo Compared to other Domes Interactive 

 
Cathedral
Roman Catholic cathedrals in Italy
Roman Catholic churches completed in 1436
15th-century establishments in the Republic of Florence
Church buildings with domes
Filippo Brunelleschi church buildings
Cathedral
Cathedral
Gothic architecture in Florence
Renaissance architecture in Florence
Cathedrals in Tuscany